Of Two Minds may refer to:

 Of Two Minds (2012 television film)
 Of Two Minds (2012 documentary film)
 "Of Two Minds" (Supergirl)
 Of Two Minds (book)